Ophtalmorrhynchini is a weevil tribe in the subfamily Entiminae.

References 

 Hoffmann, A. 1965: Curculionides inédits de la faune africaine (Col.). Bulletin de la Société entomologique de France, 70: 23–29.
 Alonso-Zarazaga, M.A.; Lyal, C.H.C. 1999: A world catalogue of families and genera of Curculionoidea (Insecta: Coleoptera) (excepting Scolytidae and Platypodidae). Entomopraxis, Barcelona.

External links 

Entiminae
Polyphaga tribes